Soledad Solaro Maxwell (October 24, 1978 in Realicó, La Pampa) is an Argentine model and television personality.

Career 
Soledad Solaro started her modeling career aged 16. She was the finalist of the Scouting Dotto Models concourse. Solaro moved to Buenos Aires due to her career, and has since worked with various popular Argentine designers, such as Laurencio Adot, Nina Ricci, Marcelo Senra, Mariano Toledo, Maureen Dinar, Iara and Fabián Kronenberg, among others.

Solaro made her debut on television in 1998, being host of the program Break Point; she was then the host of Promax Awards in 2002. Her own television show, My Carnal, started in 2000. It is currently being aired on the Fashion TV. In 2007, she appeared on the fourth season of Bailando por un sueño.

Designers represented 
 Laurencio Adot
 Nina Ricci
 Marcelo Senra
 Mariano Toledo
 Maureen Dinar
 Iara
 Fabián Kronenberg

Television 
 1998: Break Point
 2000—present: My Carnal

References

External links 
 Official Website

Living people
1978 births
Argentine female models
Argentine television personalities
Women television personalities
21st-century Argentine women